Ləgərqışlaq (also, Ashaga-Leger) is a village and municipality in the Qusar Rayon of Azerbaijan.  It has a population of 536.

References 

Populated places in Qusar District